Northern Norway Regional Health Authority is one of four regional health authorities in Norway. It covers the counties of Finnmark, Nordland and Troms. The authority owns five health trusts that operate the hospitals as well as Northern Norway Pharmaceutical Trust that operates nineteen pharmacies.

The health trusts owned are Finnmark Hospital Trust, University Hospital of North Norway,  Nordland Hospital Trust, Helgeland Hospital Trust as well as the pharmaceutical trust.

Government agencies of Norway
Health trusts of Norway
Organisations based in Bodø
Government agencies established in 2002